Jacob Israel Zeitlin (November 4, 1902 – August 30, 1987) was an American bookseller, publisher, collector, poet and intellectual in Los Angeles in the mid-twentieth century.

He was born in Racine, Wisconsin, but moved with his family to Fort Worth, Texas in his childhood and to Los Angeles in 1925.  For many years, Zeitlin lived in the Echo Park area of Los Angeles.  He opened his first bookshop in 1928, on Hope Street near 6th Street in downtown Los Angeles, and over the years moved his shop a number of times, its final location being in a converted barn on La Cienega Boulevard.  He founded the Primavera Press, to produce fine printed books, and was a co-founder of the Rounce & Coffin Club, which supported and encouraged fine printing in Southern California for many years.  During his sixty years as a rare book seller, he, along with his many friends and associates, known as the "Zeitlin circle," was a significant force in the cultural and intellectual life of Los Angeles. In 1963, he testified in a California Supreme Court obscenity hearing on Henry Miller's novel Tropic of Cancer.

Zeitlin was one of the first people to exhibit the woodcuts of fellow Echo Park resident Paul Landacre and the photographs of Edward Weston, as well as the first in America to exhibit the work of German artist Käthe Kollwitz.  Zeitlin was also a poet and the editor of Opinion, a short-lived but influential Angeleno intellectual journal.  A liberal in politics, Zeitlin was the campaign manager for Helen Gahagan Douglas' Senatorial campaign. He also lobbied against the La Cienega Boulevard highway, bringing artistic friends such as actor and art dealer Joan Ankrum to Sacramento to protest.

Notes

References

External links
 Articles, speeches, and essays by and about Jacob Zeitlin posted at HistoryofScience.com
 Interview of Jake Zeitlin, Center for Oral History Research, UCLA Library Special Collections, University of California, Los Angeles.

1902 births
1987 deaths
American booksellers
Poets from Wisconsin
20th-century American Jews
Businesspeople from Racine, Wisconsin
People from Fort Worth, Texas
Writers from Los Angeles
People from Echo Park, Los Angeles
20th-century American poets
Writers from Racine, Wisconsin
20th-century American businesspeople